Leslie Baker may refer to:

Leslie M. Baker, Jr., president and chief executive officer of Wachovia Corporation
Leslie David Baker (born 1958), American film and television actor
Leslie Forsyth Baker (1903–1981), British film executive
Leslie Gromis-Baker, Republican fundraiser and political aide in Pennsylvania
Leslie Baker (cricketer) (1904–1976), English cricketer

See also
Lesley Baker (born 1944), Australian actress, singer, dancer and comedian